Florence O'Mahony (born 1933) was an Irish hurler who played for Cork Senior Championship club Blackrock and at inter-county level with the Cork senior hurling team. He usually lined out as a centre-back but could also be deployed as a right corner-forward.

Honours

Blackrock
Cork Senior Hurling Championship (1): 1956, 1961

Cork
Munster Senior Hurling Championship (1): 1956
All-Ireland Minor Hurling Championship (1): 1951
Munster Minor Hurling Championship (1): 1951

References

1933 births
Living people
Blackrock National Hurling Club hurlers
Cork inter-county hurlers